La Reina (Spanish: "The Queen") is a commune of Chile located in Santiago Province, Santiago Metropolitan Region created in 1963 from an eastern portion of the Ñuñoa commune. It belongs to the Northeastern zone of Santiago de Chile.

La Reina is a residential commune inhabited by mostly mid to upper-mid income families and high-income groups. The Eulogio Sánchez Airport and Military Hospital are both located in the southern part of the commune.

Demographics
The population grew by 4.7% (4,352 persons) between the 1990 and 1999 censuses. The 2003 projected population was 96,551.

Average annual household income: US$42,248 (PPP, 2006)
Population below poverty line: 7.8% (2006)
Regional quality of life index: 86.23, high, 4 out of 52 (2005)
Human Development Index: 0.883, 5 out of 341 (2003)

Notable residents
Michelle Bachelet, former President of Chile
Fernando Castillo Velasco, architect, former mayor of La Reina and former governor of the Santiago Metropolitan Region
Amanda de Negri Quintana, lawyer and former political prisoner under Pinochet's regime
Mónica Echeverría Yáñez, writer
Fernando González, retired tennis player
Erich Honecker, former president of East Germany, who spent the last years of his life (1993–1994) in La Reina
Margot Honecker, former Education Minister of East Germany, wife of Erich Honecker
Ricardo Lagos, former President of Chile

Government
As a commune, La Reina is a third-level administrative division of Chile administered by a municipal council, headed by an alcalde who is directly elected every four years. The 2016-2020 mayor is José Manuel Palacios Parra (UDI). The communal council has the following members:

 Pamela Gallegos Mengoni (UDI)
 Manuel José Covarrubias Cerda (UDI)
 María Olivia Gazmuri Schleyer (RN)
 Rodolfo del Real Mihovilovic (RN)
 María Catalina Rubio Salinas (RD)
 Álvaro Andrés Delgado Martínez (PDC)
 Sara Campos Sallato (PDC)
 Adriana Muñoz Barrientos (PPD)

La Reina is represented in the Chamber of Deputies by Jaime Pilowsky (PDC) and José Antonio Kast (UDI) as part of the 24th electoral district (together with Peñalolén). The commune is represented in the Senate by Carlos Montes (PS) and Manuel José Ossandón (RN) as part of the 8th senatorial constituency (Santiago-East).

Schools

Private
The Grange School
Andrée English School
Saint John's Villa Academy
British Royal School
Colegio de La Salle
Colegio Santo Domingo

Public
Educational Complex of La Reina (Complejo Educacional de La Reina)
Swiss Confederation School (Colegio Confederación Suiza)
Yangtsé School (Colegio Yangtsé)
Palestinian School (Escuela Palestina)
San Constantino School (Colegio San Constantino)
Eugenio María de Hostos School (Liceo Eugenio María de Hostos)
Developmental School for Special Needs (Escuela Especial de Desarrollo)

References

External links
  Municipality homepage
  News about La Reina

Populated places in Santiago Province, Chile
Geography of Santiago, Chile
Communes of Chile
Populated places established in 1963